The Royal Louis was a First Rank ship of the line of the French Royal Navy, designed and constructed by François Coulomb. She replaced an earlier ship of the same name.

Following completion in 1693, the 48-pounder guns on her lower deck were replaced by 36-pounders. She initially had 6-pounder guns, later replaced by 8-pounders, and 4-pounders, replaced by 6-pounders.

Brest Dockyard noted in 1715 that she was usable only in summertime and her upperworks were beginning to rot. She was condemned in 1723 at Brest and broken up there in 1727.

References

Nomenclature des Vaisseaux du Roi-Soleil de 1661 a 1715. Alain Demerliac (Editions Omega, Nice – various dates).
The Sun King's Vessels (2015) - Jean-Claude Lemineur; English translation by François Fougerat. Editions ANCRE.  
Winfield, Rif and Roberts, Stephen (2017) French Warships in the Age of Sail 1626-1786: Design, Construction, Careers and Fates. Seaforth Publishing. . 

Ships of the line of the French Navy
1690s ships